Kabnur is a census town near Ichalkaranji in Kolhapur district Maharashtra.

Demographics
 India census, Kabnur had a population of 49894. Males constitute 53% of the population and females 47%. Kabnur has an average literacy rate of 73%, higher than the national average of 59.5%: male literacy is 79%, and female literacy is 65%. In Kabnur, 13% of the population is under 6 years of age.
Kabnur has a famous Dargah of 

The Hazrat Jandisaheb, Bransaheb Dargah. Every Thursday local people and also from nearby villages come to pray there and offer respects. The Pirs are considered the village deities. Every year, the Uroos is celebrated there. The Festival Of Urus. Also people Call The Uroos, people prepare special sweet, Malida (made from a type of wheat and jaggery). Uroos is the yearly celebration time for the people of Kabnur. Uroos comes in the month of March/April generally. Due to this Dargah, Kabnur village has been known for its communal harmony. Irrespective of their religion and caste the people come to the Dargah to pay respects. 

There are many schools in Kabnur mainly Manere high school, Kabnur Highschool and Kendriya Prathmik Shala Kabnur.

Muslim Mosques and Dargahs 

 Two Dargahs.
• Hazrat Jandi Saheb, Bran Saheb Dargah.
• Hazrat Dawood malik Dargah.

 Three Mosques.
• Inam Masjid. 
• Taqwa Masjid.
• Dargah Masjid.

References

Cities and towns in Kolhapur district